Iván Sevillano Pérez (Plasencia, 1974), alias Huecco, is a Spanish singer. He grew up in Madrid (Aluche) and Leganés. He did Media Studies, was an ice skater and one of the members of the rock band Sugarless before becoming a celebrity thanks to his single Pa' mi guerrera in 2006.

He made the videoclip Se acabaron las lágrimas with the support of the Minister for Equality.

Huecco has an organization called Fundación Dame Vida that works to distribute Soccket footballs, which have generators inside them to produce electricity when kicked, to energy-impoverished areas. The royalties from the sales of his album Dame Vida will be donated to that cause.

Discography

With Sugarless
 Asegúramelo (Mans Records, 1998)
 Más Gas (Zero Records, 2002)
 Vértigo (Zero Records, 2003)

Solo albums
 Huecco, 2006
 Assalto, 2008
Dame Vida, 2011

External links 
 Official website

References 

1974 births
Living people
Singers from Extremadura
21st-century Spanish singers
21st-century Spanish male singers